"Count Every Star" is a song written by Bruno Coquatrix and Sammy Gallop and first released by Ray Anthony and His Orchestra. It reached number 4 on the US pop chart in 1950.

Other charting versions
Hugo Winterhalter released a version of the song as a single in 1950 where it reached number 10 on the US pop chart.
Dick Haymes and Artie Shaw released a version of the song as a single in 1950 where it reached number 10 on the US pop chart.
Linda Scott released a version of the song as a single in 1962 where it reached number 10 on the US adult contemporary chart and number 41 on the Billboard pop chart.

Other versions
The Ravens released a version of the song as the B-side to their 1950 single "It's the Talk of the Town".
The Lester Young Quartet released a version of the song as a single in 1954.
Al Cohn released a version of the song on his 1954 album, Mr. Music.
Bill Snyder released a version of the song as a single in 1954.
Al Hibbler released a version of the song as part of an EP in 1956.
Grant Green released a version of the song on his 1962 album, Born to Be Blue.
Sonny Stitt released a version of the song on his 1958 album, Stitt's Bits.
Ike Quebec released a version of the song on his 1961 album, Blue & Sentimental.

References

1950 songs
1950 singles
1954 singles
1962 singles
Songs with lyrics by Sammy Gallop
Linda Scott songs
Capitol Records singles
RCA Records singles
Decca Records singles
Canadian-American Records singles